Vaduvur Duraisami Iyengar (1880 – 1942) was a Tamil writer of detective fiction in the 1940s.

He is one of the pioneer in detective story writing in Tamil language. His protagonist, Digambara Samiar, was a sanyasi or holy man on a mission to fight crime. Some of his works are made into movies such as Menaka (1935 film), Menaka (1955 film).

In 1920 he started a journal called "Manoranjini". The aim of the journal was to propagate the importance of women's education.

Works
His novels are 
Purna cantirotayam Part-1,2,3,4,5
Kumbakonam vakkil Part-1,2, 
Maya Vinotha Parathesi Part-1,2,3, 
Menaka Part-1,2, 
Soundarya Kokilam Part-1,2,3, 
Mathana kalyani Part-1,2,3, 
Vidhyasagaram, 
Vasantha Mallika.

References

Tamil-language writers
Tamil writers
Indian male novelists
1880 births
1942 deaths
20th-century Indian novelists
20th-century Indian male writers